Kocaköprü is a quarter of the town Pazar, Pazar District, Rize Province, northeastern Turkey. Its population is 895 (2021).

History 
Old names of the neighborhood are Abdoghlu and Xotri. Most inhabitants of the neighbourhood are ethnically Laz.

References

Populated places in Pazar District, Rize
Laz settlements in Turkey